Sessomatto ("Sex Nut"), internationally released as How Funny Can Sex Be?, is a 1973 Italian anthology erotic comedy film directed by Dino Risi. All the segments have sex and sexual perversions as their main theme.

The film was a commercial success.

Plot    
Madam, it's eight o'clock
A waiter doesn't know how to wake up the hostess and takes advantage of the situation to sexually abuse her.

Two hearts and a shack
Two slum spouses suspect that they are cheating on each other and therefore, every time he comes home, they beat each other. Then in a short time they make peace and make love, excited by the quarrel and beatings.

It's never too late
Enrico, a lawyer married to a beautiful young woman, actually has a gerontophile passion for women over seventy and covets one in particular, Esperia. After a close courtship, Enrico manages to conquer her and make love to her; shortly after, however, Esperia notices that Enrico enters her house even when she is not there, and suspects that the man is actually interested in the young maid Valeria; instead, she will find Enrico intent on betraying her with her ninety-year-old mother.

Honeymoon trip
Two newlyweds, she from Veneto and him from Romagna, go on their honeymoon to Venice, but, although he appears to be an extremely fiery man, he therefore fails to consummate the marriage. The wife discovers that her husband can only make love on moving means of transport, and so they will do it for the first time in the elevator of their apartment building.

Come back my little one
A man left by his wife asks a young and beautiful prostitute to dress up like her, making herself so fat and unattractive, to try to delude himself in some way of getting back the woman with whom he is still so much in love.

Italian worker abroad
An Italian who emigrated to Denmark works as a sperm donor. One day he masturbates thinking about the beautiful nun in the hospital. The episode is performed in Danish, without subtitles.

Revenge
In Collesano, Sicily, a gentleman was killed following a sgarro to the powerful local mafia boss, don Alvaro Macaluso. During the period of mourning, the young and beautiful widow receives don Alvaro, a well-known womanizer, and lets him understand that she is willing to become his mistress. The boss does not hesitate to take the woman to his house and subject her to extraordinary sexual performances, until he dies of a heart attack. In fact, the young widow had devised this plan precisely to avenge her husband.

A difficult love
Saturnino, a young Apulian who has just arrived in Milan in search of fortune, believes he can count on his brother Cosimo who has settled in the Lombard capital for several years, but his sister-in-law tells him that Cosimo has long been unavailable. Before returning to the town, Saturnino enters a popular dance hall, where he meets Gilda, a charming Milanese lady with whom he falls in love, immediately reciprocated. The relationship will prove rather stormy and has a first setback when Saturnino realizes that Gilda is a prostitute by profession. Just time to make peace and the couple suffers a new breakup when Nino discovers that Gilda is not a woman, but a transvestite. Even this obstacle is overcome, but the matter becomes heavily complicated, when Saturnino realizes that he has fallen in love with his brother Cosimo.

The guest
The beautiful wife of an industrialist tries to seduce a guest invited to dinner. Eventually, the woman's husband throws the guest away and thanks his wife for playing her role as provocateur well. By now excited by the woman, the guest takes his leave and throws himself at the waitress, who complains about how these invitations to dinner from "strangers" always end up in this way in which she is the one who pays for them.

Cast 
 Giancarlo Giannini: Domenico/ Cesaretto/ Enrico/ Lello/ Giansiro/ The Donor/ Michele Maccò/ Saturnino/ Dottor Bianchi 
 Laura Antonelli: Madame Juliette/ Celestina/ Enrico's Wife/ Grazia/ Tamara/ The Nun/ Donna Mimma Maccò/ Tiziana  
 Paola Borboni: Esperia 
 Alberto Lionello: Cosimo/Gilda
 Duilio Del Prete: Vittorio
 Carla Mancini: Maid

See also   
 List of Italian films of 1973

References

External links

1973 films
Italian anthology films
Italian LGBT-related films
Commedia all'italiana
Films directed by Dino Risi
Films set in Rome
Films set in Venice
Films set in Denmark
Films set in Sicily
Films set in Milan
Films shot in Venice
Films with screenplays by Ruggero Maccari
Films scored by Armando Trovajoli
1970s sex comedy films
1973 comedy films
1970s Italian films